Weihui, formerly Jixian or Ji County, is a county-level city in the north of Henan province, China. It is under the administration of the prefecture-level city of Xinxiang.

Administrative divisions
As 2012, this city is divided to 7 towns and 6 townships.
Towns

Townships

Climate

References

External links

Cities in Henan
County-level divisions of Henan
Xinxiang